Souchez Glacier is a tributary glacier about 17 nautical miles (31 km) long, flowing from Mount Crockett south along the east side of Faulkner Escarpment and then turning southeast to parallel the southwest side of Hays Mountains. It joins Bartlett Glacier just south of Mount Dietz, in the Queen Maud Mountains. Named by Advisory Committee on Antarctic Names (US-ACAN) for Roland A. Souchez, involved in geological studies at McMurdo Station during the season of 1965–66.

Glaciers of Amundsen Coast